Ratu Semi Bayameyame Seruvakula (died 4 December 2018 aged 85) was a Fijian chief and former  politician, who served as Assistant Minister for Education in the interim Cabinet formed by Laisenia Qarase in the wake of the Fiji coup of 2000.  He held office until an elected government took power in September 2001.

Seruvakula was the chief of Nasautoka village in Wainibuka District, which is part of Tailevu Province.

References

Fijian chiefs
Government ministers of Fiji
Politicians from Tailevu Province
Year of birth missing
2018 deaths